Fowler's Bluff is an unincorporated community in Levy County, Florida, United States. It is a small, riverside central Florida community near the southern end of the Suwannee River.  The nearest significant city is Chiefland, approximately 15 miles to the northeast.  The community provides river access via a public boat ramp located at 15597 NW 46th Lane, Chiefland, FL 32626.

References

Unincorporated communities in Levy County, Florida
Unincorporated communities in Florida